Gagran is a village in the Ghazipur district of the State of Uttar Pradesh in India. Dildarnagar is the nearest railway station from this village. Nagsar is nearest local railway station which is added by Dildarnagar. The Village was before a part of Nagsar later in 1600s one family adopted Christianity and established the Village Gagran. 

Villages in Ghazipur district